Betula medwediewii, called Transcaucasian birch, Caucasian birch or Medwediew's birch, is a species of birch which is native to Turkey, Georgia, and Iran. It is decaploid, with its closest diploid relatives being Betula humilis and probably Betula lenta from eastern North America. It is placed in section Lentae, subgenus Aspera. Its cultivar 'Gold Bark' has gained the Royal Horticultural Society's Award of Garden Merit.

References

medwediewii
Flora of the Transcaucasus
Plants described in 1887